RAK Airways was an airline based in Ras Al Khaimah, one of the seven states in the United Arab Emirates. It was established in 2006 but briefly ceased operations in 2009 and relaunched in 2010 with a new livery and under new management. On 1 January 2014, the airline suspended all its flights but announced that they may resume at a future date after a restructuring process.

History
First news about a new airline based in Ras Al Khaimah emerged in 2005 and it was initially called Al Hamra Airlines. UAE Cabinet has later issued its official approval for setting up the RAK Airways as a national carrier in its decision No. 328/4 for 2005. The new airways launched operations in early 2007. The carrier was hard hit during the financial crisis of 2007–2010 and ceased operations in 2009.

In 2010 the airline announced that it would be resuming operations with a New "value-for-money" business model, aiming to position itself between full-service and low-cost carriers.

In February 2011, it was revealed that RAK Airways was planning on launching flights to between five and nine new destinations. Though it acknowledged the difficulty of securing slots at several of the destinations due to rival carriers in the UAE, it announced that it was finalizing a codeshare agreement with an Asian carrier and that it would also be increasing the size of its fleet.

In 2013, RAK Airways launched flights to Islamabad, Pakistan; and Amman, Jordan.

RAK Airways announced the immediate suspension of all operations on 1 January 2014, citing economic considerations.

Destinations

In December 2013, RAK Airways served the following destinations:

Bus operations
RAK Airways also operated bus services from Ras Al Khaimah to other UAE destinations like Abu Dhabi, Dubai, Al Ain, Ajman, Fujairah, Sharjah, Umm Al Quwain, and Khor Fakkan.

Fleet
As of August 2013, the RAK Airways fleet consisted of the following aircraft and had pending orders for Boeing 737 Next Generation :

References

External links

 rakairways.com (last official record on archive.org). No longer an official website.

Defunct airlines of the United Arab Emirates
Airlines established in 2006
Airlines disestablished in 2014
2014 disestablishments in the United Arab Emirates
Emirati companies established in 2006